

The Nuri Demirağ Nu D.36 was a 1930s Turkish two-seat training biplane built by the Nuri Demirağ Aircraft Works in Istanbul for the Turkish military.

Design
The Nu D.36 is an unequal-span single-bay staggered biplane with a fixed conventional landing gear with a tailskid. It was powered by a  Walter Gemma I nine-cylinder radial engine. It had two open tandem cockpits for the pilot and trainee.

Operators

Turkish Air Force

Specifications

References

1930s Turkish military trainer aircraft
Single-engined tractor aircraft
Nu D.36
Biplanes